A lingua ignota (Latin for "unknown language") was  described by the 12th century abbess of Rupertsberg St. Hildegard of Bingen, OSB, who apparently used it for mystical purposes. It consists of vocabulary with no known grammar; the only known text is individual words embedded in Latin. To write it, Hildegard used an alphabet of 23 letters denominated litterae ignotae.

History 

St. Hildegard partially described the language in a work titled Ignota lingua per simplicem hominem Hildegardem prolata, which survived in two manuscripts, both dating to ca. 1200, the Wiesbaden Codex and a Berlin MS (Lat. Quart. 4º 674), previously Codex Cheltenhamensis 9303, collected by Sir Thomas Phillipps. The text is a glossary of 1011 words in Lingua ignota, with glosses mostly in Latin, sometimes in Middle High German; the words appear to be a priori coinages, mostly nouns with a few adjectives. Grammatically it appears to be a partial relexification of Latin, that is, a language formed by substituting new vocabulary into an existing grammar.<ref>Barbara Jean Jeskalian, Hildegard of Bingen: the creative dimensions of a Medieval personality."  Graduate Theological Union</ref>

The purpose of Lingua ignota is unknown, and it is not known who, besides its creator, was familiar with it. In the 19th century some believed that Hildegard intended her language to be an ideal, universal language. However, in the 21st century it is assumed that Lingua ignota was devised as a secret language; like Hildegard's "unheard music", she would have attributed it to divine inspiration. To the extent that the language was constructed by Hildegard, it may be considered one of the earliest known constructed languages.

In a letter to Hildegard, her friend and provost Wolmarus, fearing that Hildegard would soon die, asks ubi tunc vox inauditae melodiae? et vox inauditae linguae? (Descemet, p. 346; "where, then, the voice of the unheard melody? And the voice of the unheard language?"), suggesting that the existence of Hildegard's language was known, but there were no initiates who would have preserved its knowledge after her death.

Sample text
The only extant text in the language is the following short passage:

These two sentences are written mostly in Latin with five key words in Lingua ignota; as only one of these is unambiguously found in the glossary ("people"), it is clear that the vocabulary was larger than 1011 words.  (Higley 2007 finds probable correspondences for two other words.)

 "people" is apparently inflected as a third-declension Latin noun, yielding the genitive plural  "of the peoples".

Newman (1987) conjectures the translation
"O measureless Church, / girded with divine arms / and adorned with jacinth, / you are the fragrance of the wounds of nations / and the city of sciences. / O, o, and you are anointed / amid-noble sound, / and you are a sparkling gem."

Glossary
The glossary is in a hierarchical order, first giving terms for God and angels, followed by terms for human beings and terms for family relationships, followed by terms for body-parts, illnesses, religious and worldly ranks, craftsmen, days, months, clothing, household implements, plants, and a few birds and insects. Terms for mammals are lacking (except for the bat, Ualueria, listed among birds, and the gryphon, Argumzio, a half-mammal, also listed among the birds).

The first 30 entries are (after Roth 1880):
{{columns-list|colwidth=30em|
 Aigonz: deus (God)
 Aieganz: angelus (angel)
 Zuuenz: sanctus (saint)
 Liuionz: salvator (saviour)
 Diueliz: diabolus (devil)
 Ispariz: spiritus Inimois: homo (human being)
 Jur: vir (man)
 Vanix: femina (woman)
 Peuearrez: patriarcha Korzinthio: propheta Falschin: vates Sonziz: apostolus Linschiol: martir Zanziuer: confessor Vrizoil: virgo (virgin)
 Jugiza: vidua (widow)
 Pangizo: penitens Kulzphazur: attavus (great-great-great-grandfather)
 Phazur: avus (grandfather)
 Peueriz: pater (father)
 Maiz: maler (sic, for mater, mother)
 Hilzpeueriz: nutricus (stepfather)
 Hilzmaiz: noverca (stepmother)
 Scirizin: filius (son)
 Hilzscifriz: privignus (stepson)
 Limzkil: infans (infant)
 Zains: puer (boy)
 Zunzial: iuvenis (youth)
 Bischiniz: adolescens (adolescent)
}}

Nominal composition may be observed in peueriz "father" : hilz-peueriz "stepfather", maiz "mother" : hilz-maiz "stepmother", and scirizin "son" : hilz-scifriz "stepson", as well as phazur : kulz-phazur. Suffixal derivation in peueriz "father", peuearrez "patriarch".

Editions
Wilhelm Grimm (1848), listing only the 291 glosses with German translations
Roth (1880), consisting of the 1011 glosses.
Descemet, Analecta of Pitra (1882), listing only the 181 glosses giving the names of plants
Portmann and Odermatt (1986)
Hildegard of Bingen's Unknown Language: An Edition, Translation, and Discussion, ed. Sarah Higley (2007) [the entire Riesencodex glossary, with additions from the Berlin MS, translations into English, and extensive commentary]

See also
Hiberno-Latin, a learned style of literary Latin spread by Irish monks during the period from the sixth century to the tenth century. It used unusual words and loanwords from Greek, Hebrew and Irish.
Hermeneutic style, a style of Latin in the later Roman and early Medieval periods characterized by the extensive use of unusual and arcane words, especially derived from Greek. 
Glossolalia
Artistic language
Philosophical language

Literature
Traude Bollig / Ingrid Richter, Hildegard von Bingen, Heilwerden mit der Kraft ihrer Symbole, Aurum Verlag,  (an esoteric claim of decipherment of the litterae)
Jakob Grimm in: Haupt, Zeitschrift für deutsches Alterthum, VI, 321.
 Hildegard of Bingen's Unknown Language: An Edition, Translation and Discussion by Sarah L. Higley. (Palgrave Macmillan, 2007)
Laurence Moulinier, "Un lexique trilingue du XIIe siècle : la lingua ignota de Hildegarde de Bingen", dans Lexiques bilingues dans les domaines philosophique et scientifique (Moyen Âge-Renaissance), Actes du colloque international organisé par l’Ecole Pratique des Hautes Etudes-Ive Section et l’Institut Supérieur de Philosophie de l’Université Catholique de Louvain, Paris, 12-14 juin 1997, éd. J. Hamesse, D. Jacquart, Turnhout, Brepols, 2001, p. 89-111. 
Jonathan P. Green, « A new gloss on Hildegard of Bingen's Lingua ignota », Viator, 36, 2005, p. 217-234.
Barbara Newman, Sister of Wisdom: St. Hildegard's Theology of the Feminine (Berkeley: University of California Press, 1987).
Marie-Louise Portmann and Alois Odermatt (eds.), Wörterbuch der unbekannten Sprache, Basel: Verlag Basler Hildegard-Gesellschaft (1986). 

Jeffrey Schnapp, "Virgin's words: Hildegard of Bingen's Lingua Ignota and the Development of Imaginary Languages Ancient to Modern", Exemplaria, III, 2, 1991, pp. 267–298.

References

External links 
 Transliterate text to St. Hildegard's litteræ ignotæ alphabet.
 Langmaker profile of Lingua Ignota
 Eclecticify: Lingua Ignota: a partial English glossary of the Lingua Ignota by an amateur translator.

Constructed languages
Language and mysticism
Medieval literature
Benedictine literature
Languages attested from the 12th century
Forms of Latin
12th-century Latin literature
Languages of Germany
Hildegard of Bingen